
Folie or Folies may refer to:

Places
 Condé-Folie, commune in the Picardie region of France
 Fains-la-Folie, commune in the Eure-et-Loir department in north-central France
 Folies, commune in the Somme département in the Picardie region of France
 Forêt-la-Folie, commune in the Haute-Normandie region of northern France
 Hubert-Folie, commune in the Basse-Normandie region of northern France.
 La Folie, commune in the Basse-Normandie region of northern France

Film and television
 À la folie, 1994 film by Diane Kurys
 "Folie a Deux" (The X-Files), 19th episode of season 5 of television series The X-Files
 La Folie du Docteur Tube, 1915 short silent experimental film directed by Abel Gance
 La folie du doute, 1920 French silent film directed by René Leprince

Music
 "À la folie ou pas du tout", Belgian entry in the 1972 Eurovision Song Contest
 Absinthe: La Folie Verte, 2001 concept album by Blood Axis and Les Joyaux De La Princesse
 Folie à Deux (album), 2008 album by Fall Out Boy
 Folkfuck Folie, 2007 album by French black metal band Peste Noire
 La Folie (album), 1981 album by The Stranglers
 "Nuit de folie", 1988 popular song by French pop duet Début de Soirée

Others
 A Bar at the Folies-Bergère, the last major work by French painter Édouard Manet
 Folie à deux, rare psychiatric syndrome
 Folie a deux winery, winery in the Napa Valley, California, USA
 Folies Bergère, Parisian music hall, France

See also
 Foly, a surname
 Folly (disambiguation)
 Follies (disambiguation)
 Foley (disambiguation)